Louisa Petty, Marchioness of Lansdowne (1755 – 7 August 1789), known as Louisa Petty, Countess of Shelburne from 1779 until 1784, was the youngest daughter of John FitzPatrick, 1st Earl of Upper Ossory, and his wife Lady Evelyn (née Leveson-Gower; daughter of John Leveson-Gower, 1st Earl Gower).

Petty's eldest brother was John FitzPatrick, 2nd Earl of Upper Ossory. She had a younger brother Richard, who also became a noted statesman and soldier, and an elder sister, Mary. She married, as his second wife, William Petty, 2nd Earl of Shelburne, who served as Prime Minister for 10 months in 1782–83, and was afterwards created Marquess of Lansdowne. The couple were married on 8 July 1779 and had a son, Henry Petty-Fitzmaurice, 3rd Marquess of Lansdowne, and a daughter, Lady Louisa Fitzmaurice.

She died on 7 August 1789.

References

 
 

1755 births
1789 deaths
18th-century Irish people
FitzPatrick dynasty
Spouses of prime ministers of the United Kingdom
British marchionesses
Daughters of Irish earls
Wives of knights